Emmanuel Tuffour (born December 2, 1966) is a retired Ghanaian sprinter. His best performance in a global event was a seventh place at the 1993 World Championships, but at the 1992 Olympics he failed to qualify for the final by 0.01 second. Tuffour is one of the current national record holders in 4 x 100 m relay with 38,12 seconds, achieved at the 1997 World Championships in Athens.As an experienced. retired athletic champion he plans to put up an athletic academy in his country, Ghana to help give the necessary development to the next generation in the year 2020.

International competitions

1Representing Africa
2Did not start in the final

External links

1966 births
Living people
Ghanaian male sprinters
Athletes (track and field) at the 1988 Summer Olympics
Athletes (track and field) at the 1992 Summer Olympics
Athletes (track and field) at the 1996 Summer Olympics
Olympic athletes of Ghana
African Games silver medalists for Ghana
African Games medalists in athletics (track and field)
African Games bronze medalists for Ghana
Athletes (track and field) at the 1991 All-Africa Games
Athletes (track and field) at the 1995 All-Africa Games
20th-century Ghanaian people
21st-century Ghanaian people